Maria Creek is a glacial meltwater stream  long, which flows from the snout of Canada Glacier in Taylor Valley, Victoria Land, Antarctica. It drains northeast, close to the glacier, entering the western end of Lake Fryxell to the west of Bowles Creek and Green Creek. The name was suggested by Diane McKnight, a United States Geological Survey hydrologist working in the Lake Fryxell basin, 1987–94, and alludes to the many aeolian deposits of fine sands along the creek, indicative of strong winds blowing around the south end of Canada Glacier during the winter. The name comes from the song They Call the Wind Maria from Paint Your Wagon, the American musical play by Lerner and Loewe.

References

Rivers of Victoria Land
McMurdo Dry Valleys